Richard Steere may refer to:

Richard Steere (fencer) (1909–2001), American Olympic fencer
Richard Steere (author) (1643–1721), colonial American merchant and poet

See also
Dick Steere, American football player
Dick Steere (rugby union), New Zealand rugby union player